Eurico Mendonça de Caires (5 August 1952 – 13 November 1989), known simply as Eurico, was a Portuguese footballer who played as a midfielder.

He represented clubs in Portugal, Canada and the United States.

Club career
Born in Funchal, Madeira, Eurico played youth football with S.L. Benfica, being promoted to the first team for the 1971–72 season and making one Primeira Liga appearance, as a substitute. He went on to represent, always in the top flight, S.C. Beira-Mar, C.D. Montijo and G.D. Estoril Praia.

At the end of the 1975–76 campaign, Eurico moved abroad to play in the North American Soccer League, having brief spells with Toronto Metros-Croatia and the Rochester Lancers before returning to Portugal with Estoril and C.F. Os Belenenses.

Eurico retired in June 1985 at nearly 33 after three years in the lower leagues, amassing Portuguese top division totals of 171 games and 16 goals. He died seven years later.

External links

NASL profile

1952 births
1989 deaths
Sportspeople from Funchal
Portuguese footballers
Madeiran footballers
Association football midfielders
Primeira Liga players
Liga Portugal 2 players
S.L. Benfica footballers
S.C. Beira-Mar players
C.D. Montijo players
G.D. Estoril Praia players
C.F. Os Belenenses players
C.F. União players
C.F. Estrela da Amadora players
North American Soccer League (1968–1984) players
Toronto Blizzard (1971–1984) players
Rochester Lancers (1967–1980) players
Portugal youth international footballers
Portuguese expatriate footballers
Expatriate soccer players in Canada
Expatriate soccer players in the United States
Portuguese expatriate sportspeople in Canada
Portuguese expatriate sportspeople in the United States